Demos: A Story of English Socialism is a novel by the English author George Gissing.<ref>{{cite book|last=Sutherland|first=John|author-link=John Sutherland (author)|url=https://books.google.com/books?id=QzJ3yNVVqtUC&pg=PA179|chapter=Demos|pages=179|title=The Stanford Companion to Victorian Literature|orig-year=1989|year=1990}}</ref> It was written between late 1885 and March 1886 and first published in April 1886 by Smith, Elder & Co.

Plot summary
It tells the story of a young, lower-class, Radical working-man, Richard Mutimer, who unexpectedly inherits a large fortune. He becomes the leader of a socialist movement and decides to use his inheritance to set up a cooperative factory. However, his new wealth and power serve to highlight the defects of character that he brings from his working-class origin and he begins to treat his workers harshly, as well as abandoning the girl of his own station to whom he had been engaged.

Later in life, Mutimer marries an upper-middle-class woman (who does not love him) and stands for Parliament. However, his downfall begins when his wife, Adela, finds a later version of the will that had enriched Mutimer. As this could deprive him of his inheritance, he wants to destroy it but Adela will not permit this and the money goes to the rightful heir. The cooperative factory is shut down and the couple move to London, to live in relative poverty.

Mutimer starts another populist movement but is killed by a stone thrown at him by a demonstrator during a meeting at which his followers turn against him.

References

 

Further reading
 Goode, John (1968). "Gissing, Morris, and English Socialism," Victorian Studies, Vol. XII, No. 2, pp. 201–226.
 Goode, John (1969). "Gissing's 'Demos': A Controversy," Victorian Studies, Vol. XII, No. 4, pp. 431–444.
 Lelchuk, Alan (1969). "'Demos': The Ordeal of the Two Gissings," Victorian Studies, Vol. XII, No. 3, pp. 357–374.
 Sporn, Paul (1969). "Gissing's 'Demos': Late-Victorian Values and the Displacement of Conjugal Love," Studies in the Novel,'' Vol. I, No. 3, pp. 334–346.

External links
 Demos, Vol. II, Vol. III, at Internet Archive
 
 

Novels by George Gissing
1886 British novels
Victorian novels
Novels set in England
Novels set in the 19th century